The Rough Guide to the Music of Morocco refers to two albums by the World Music Network:

 The Rough Guide to the Music of Morocco (2004 album)
 The Rough Guide to the Music of Morocco (2012 album)